= Bagli, Bhopal =

Bagli
- village
- Location within Madhya Pradesh Location within India
- Coordinates: 23.165313°N 77.490016°E
- Country: India
- State: Madhya Pradesh
- District: Bhopal
- Tehsil: Huzur

Population (2011)
  - Total: 489
- Time zone: UTC+5:30 (IST)
- ISO 3166 code: MP-IN
- Census code: 482551

Bagli is a village in the Bhopal district of Madhya Pradesh, India. It is located in the Huzur tehsil and the Phanda block. The IBD Queens Court gated community is located here.

== Demographics ==
According to the 2011 census of India, Bagli has 106 households. The effective literacy rate (i.e. the literacy rate of population excluding children aged 6 and below) is 88.02%.

Demographics (2011 Census)
	Total	Male	Female
Population	489	244	245
Children aged below 6 years	80	34	46
Scheduled caste	40	19	21
Scheduled tribe	116	59	57
Literates	360	186	174
Workers (all)	181	123	58
Main workers (total)	164	120	44
Main workers: Cultivators	47	42	5
Main workers: Agricultural labourers	59	31	28
Main workers: Household industry workers	11	8	3
Main workers: Other	47	39	8
Marginal workers (total)	17	3	14
Marginal workers: Cultivators	1	0	1
Marginal workers: Agricultural labourers	8	1	7
Marginal workers: Household industry workers	4	0	4
Marginal workers: Others	4	2	2
Non-workers	308	121	187
